Optimal, Inc. or Optimal Social, is a social media advertising company of the net worth of $35 million,  acquired by Brand Networks in October 2013 . The company was awarded the grand Prize by Facebook  on October 9,2013 for the innovation in its Facebook Preferred Marketing Developer Innovation contest among over 60 companies.

Optimal, Inc. changed its name from XA.net, Inc. in 2012. At the same time, it named Mike Greenfield to its advisory board. XA.net, Inc. was previously named one of the top 10 fastest-growing private companies in the San Francisco Bay Area in 2011 by the San Francisco Business Times. The other 9 of the top 10 companies in the San Francisco Business Times Fast 100 in 2011 were Neste Collective, Stella & Dot, Spigit, Bizo, Bay Equity, Marketo, TubeMogul, Advantis Global Services and Covermate Food Covers.

References

American companies established in 2008